The  is a DC electric multiple unit (EMU) train type developed by Japanese National Railways (JNR) and now operated by West Japan Railway Company (JR-West), and the Shinano Railway.

Operations

JR East
JR East operated their last 115 series train on 11 March 2022. 115 series trains were previously used on the Shōnan-Shinjuku Line, Takasaki Line, Utsunomiya Line, Chuo Main Line(East Line), Shinonoi Line, Oito Line, Agatsuma Line, Ryomo Line, Joetsu Line, Shinetsu Main Line, Yahiko Line, and the Echigo Line.

JR-West
Currently used on the Hakubi Line, Maizuru Line, Sagano Line, Sanin Main Line and the Sanyō Main Line

JR Central
Formerly used on the Minobu Line, Gotemba Line and the Tōkaidō Main Line. Sets owned by JR East currently operate on the JR Central Iida Line and Chūō Main Line (West Line).

Shinano Railway
Currently used on the Shinano Railway Line. Start of retirement in July 2020 with the debut of the new SR1 series on 4 July 2020.

Variants

115-0 series
This is a cold-weather and mountainous line version of the earlier 113 series.

115-300 series
Air-conditioned version introduced from 1973.

115-1000 series
Introduced from 1978 with increased seat pitch and improved cold-weather performance.

115-2000 series
Hiroshima, Shimonoseki and Shizuoka area version introduced in 1978. Specifications based on 115-1000 series.

115-3000 series
Two-door version introduced from November 1982 to replace 153 series EMUs on "Rapid" services in the Shimonoseki area.

115-3500 series
Former 117 series MoHa 117 and MoHa 116 two-door cars converted from May 1992 for use in the Okayama and Hiroshima areas.

115-6000 series
JR-West 2-car sets converted in 1999 by building new cabs at one end of former MoHa (non-driving motor) cars.

Livery variations

Special liveries
In January 2017, Niigata-based set N3 was repainted into the original "Niigata Livery" of red and yellow formerly carried by JNR 70 series EMU trains.

In April 2017, Shinano Railway three-car set S7 was repainted into the original Nagano livery of cream and green as part of the Shinshu area promotional campaign to be held from July to September 2017.

In September 2017, Niigata-based set N37 was repainted in the first "Niigata area" livery.

Withdrawal
Withdrawals first begun in 1985 following the introduction of 211 series. The 115 series were gradually phased out on some services. The first units were scrapped in 1987.

Preserved examples
Former JR East end car KuMoHa 115 1061 is scheduled to be displayed at the Niigata City Niitsu Railway Museum in Niitsu, Niigata between July and September 2017.

References

External links

 JR East 115 series 

Electric multiple units of Japan
Train-related introductions in 1963
East Japan Railway Company
West Japan Railway Company
Shinano Railway Line
1500 V DC multiple units of Japan